Dr. M. G. Sasibhooshan (1 January 1951) is an orator, writer, art historian, and consultant in Indology based in Thiruvananthapuram, Kerala, India.

Life sketch 
Mundathu Gupthan Sasibhooshan is the son of S. Guptan Nair, one of the noted critics in Malayalam Literature. He started his career as a sub-editor for Malayala Manorama and Mathrubhumi newspapers and then went on to teach for 18 years at the University of Kerala in Thiruvananthapuram. He has extensively researched on murals and sculptures of more than 300 temples in South India and is considered a subject expert in snake worship and temple history of Kerala. 

He was part of the executive committee for the Kerala Sahithya Akademi, Kerala Kala Mandalam and the Numismatic Society of India. Under deputation, he also held the office of Director at State Literacy Mission Kerala for a brief period. He was instrumental in setting up the Institute of Mural Painting in Guruvayoor, established to foster the temple art. He was also the former director at Vylopilli Samskriti Bhavan and is a patron of Chinmaya Mission Thiruvananthapuram 

He has published numerous articles and books on Kerala art and culture in English and Malayalam. Sasibhooshan has co-authored many articles in English with his wife Bindu S. The couple has two children Gautam and Gayathri.

Bibliography 

 Dr.M.G. Sasibhooshan(1994)
 
 
 Dr.M.G. Sasibhooshan(2005) 
 Keralathile Daru Shilpangal
 
 Asethu Himachalam
 
 Kerala Charithram Apriya Neerikshanangal
 
 Kerala charitrathilekkulla Nattuvazhikal
 Dr.M.G. Sasibhooshan(2017)
 Dr.M.G. Sasibhooshan(2017)
 Dr.M.G. Sasibhooshan (2019)

References 

1951 births
Living people
Indian Indologists
Indian numismatists
Recipients of the Kerala Sahitya Akademi Award
Malayalam-language writers
Writers from Thiruvananthapuram
Indian art historians
Scholars from Thiruvananthapuram